The Cancer Institute NSW was established under the Cancer Institute Act, 2003 to lessen the impact of cancer in NSW.

It works with a variety of partners to implement programs that focus on cancer prevention, detection, treatment, and research.

Other cancer services and resources 
The Cancer Institute NSW also develops and manages a number of cancer-related information sources and services for the people of NSW. These include:
   The NSW Cancer Registry
   Canrefer: an online directory for General practitioners, patients and carers to find referral information for specialist multidisciplinary cancer teams in NSW
   : a portal for cancer treatments, providing evidence-based chemotherapy protocols, treatment information and tools at the point of care.
   : an online community-based smoking cessation support website
   BreastScreen NSW
   Cervical Screening NSW

See also

New South Wales Cancer Institute Awards
Australian Melanoma Research Foundation
Cancer

References

2003 establishments in Australia
Government agencies established in 2003
Government agencies of New South Wales
Medical and health organisations based in New South Wales
Cancer organisations based in Australia